The Elkhorn Mountains are a mountain range in southwestern Montana, part of the Rocky Mountains and are roughly 300,000 acres (1200 km²) in size. The range is surrounded by the cities of Helena, Montana City, Townsend, Whitehall, and Boulder and is part of the Helena National Forest in Montana's Jefferson County.

Geology
The rocks of the Elkhorns were formed about 74 to 81 million years ago (Late Cretaceous time) as a result of the Farallon tectonic plate subducting beneath western North America and allowing magma to rise to the surface. The Elkhorn Mountains Volcanics are extrusive rocks related to the plutonic granites of the Boulder Batholith. Mineral deposits associated with the Elkhorn Mountains Volcanics include those mined at Elkhorn, Montana, now a ghost town, and gold at the Golden Sunlight Mine near Whitehall, which is associated with a breccia pipe in the volcanics.

The mountain range seen today is related to regional structural uplift dating mostly to Oligocene time.

The Land

A forest fire in 1988 burned 47,000 acres (190 km²) of the mountain range, leaving carpets of seedlings growing into new lodgepole pine forests.  The land has been used extensively in the past for gold and silver mining, logging, and open range grazing, leaving a noticeable impact; most notably the abandoned mining town of Elkhorn.  Recently with efforts conducted by the BLM, Montana FWP and Helena National Forest, new conservation and wildlife management plans have been put into place including big horn sheep reintroduction and the westslope cutthroat trout  restoration program.  Management of the 2000+ elk herd in the area and the suppression of noxious weeds is also an ongoing task.  

Despite the impacts of mining, around 100,000 acres of the Elkhorns were still roadless in 1992; this included 85,000 acres of roadless National Forest land as well as adjacent BLM, state and private lands. Congress designated 175,000 acres of the range as the "Elkhorns Wildlife Management Area," and one of Montana's most productive elk herds inhabits the range.  Because the Elkhorns are higher in elevation than the nearby section of the Continental Divide, they catch more moisture than do most other ranges east of the Divide. For this reason, the Elkhorns are especially diverse, with 148 documented vertebrate species.

See also
 List of mountain ranges in Montana

Notes

External links
Geology of the Elkhorn Mountains Volcanics
Elkhorn Wildlife Management Unit
 Elkhorn Mountain Endurance Runs

Mountain ranges of Montana
Ranges of the Rocky Mountains
Geology of Montana
Landforms of Jefferson County, Montana
Helena National Forest